Stephen Day may refer to:
 Stephen Day (MP) (born 1948), Conservative Party politician in the United Kingdom, and former Member of Parliament (MP)
 Stephen Day (printer) (c. 1610-1668), first working printer in the American colonies
 Stephen A. Day (1882–1950), US lawyer and member of the House of Representatives, 1941–1945
Steve Day, comedian

See also
Rear Admiral  Steven E. Day, US Deputy Commander for Mobilization and Reserve Affairs Atlantic Area US Coast Guard
Stephen Daye Sr. (c. 1594–1668), first British North American printer